Sabuloglossum is a fungal genus in the earth tongue family Geoglossaceae. Circumscribed in 2013, it contains the single widely distributed species Sabuloglossum arenarium, which has previously been placed in the genera Microglossum, Corynetes, Geoglossum, and Thuemenidium. The generic name derives from the Latin word sabulum and refers to its preference for sandy habitats.

References

Geoglossaceae
Ascomycota genera
Fungi of Asia
Fungi of Europe
Fungi of North America
Taxa described in 2013